John W. Brown (1867 – June 19, 1941) was a labor union leader.

Born in Canada, he moved to Maine and worked as a joiner at the Bath Iron Works, where he became involved with the labor movement. He became an organizer for the United Brotherhood of Carpenters, then went to the United Mine Workers and was involved with the Colorado conflicts of 1913 and 1914, including the Ludlow Massacre.

In 1934 he was living in Woolwich, Maine, where he helped organize Local 4  of the Industrial Union of Marine and Shipbuilding Workers of America, and later served on the union's board. From 1936 on he wrote a regular column for the Shipyard Worker, the union's newspaper.

He died at home, from an accidental discharge of his hunting rifle. Liberty ship SS John W. Brown was named after him the following year; the ship has been preserved as a museum.

External links
 John W. Brown biography

1867 births
1941 deaths
Canadian emigrants to the United States
United Brotherhood of Carpenters and Joiners of America people
United Mine Workers people
Firearm accident victims in the United States
Accidental deaths in Maine
Deaths by firearm in Maine
People from Bath, Maine
People from Woolwich, Maine
Trade unionists from Maine